Pizzo di Porcaresc (also known as Pizzo di Porcareccio) is a mountain of the Lepontine Alps, located on the border between Switzerland and Italy. Its summit is the tripoint between the Valle dell'Isorno (in the Italian region of Piedmont), the Valle di Campo and the Valle di Vergeletto (both in the Swiss canton of Ticino).

References

External links
 Pizzo di Porcaresc on Hikr

Lepontine Alps
Mountains of the Alps
Mountains of Switzerland
Mountains of Italy
Mountains of Ticino
Italy–Switzerland border
International mountains of Europe